The Cosmos-class submarine, officially Cos.Mo.S MG-110 locally designated as X-Craft, are the class of midget submarines designed by the Italian firm Cos.Mo.S, in Karachi Naval Dockyard in Karachi, Sindh, Pakistan. 

The Cosmos-class submarines are currently stationed in PNS Iqbal and are used as the SDV for the SEAL Teams of the Navy Special Service Group, since 1993. Despite classified as submarine by its builder in Karachi, the Cosmos, nonetheless, fall under the responsibility of the Naval Strategic Forces Command for planning development while the Commander of the Coastal Areas remains in charge for the operational deployments only.

Design overview

Design was initially conceived in 1983–85 in Italy for the COMSUBIN (special forces) of the Marina Militare (Italian Navy), which was already operating a large fleet of midget class submarines in their inventory. The Italian firm, Cosmos, had initially designed for the eight submarines, along with the designs of three  for the Republic of Korea Navy in 1983.

The Cosmos are more capable of conducting the operations than their predecessor design, the  submarine in 1970s. The Cosmos can launch the Mark 5 torpedo from the standard 533 mm torpedo tubes according to the research paper published by Massimo Annati in 1996 at the United States Naval Academy in Maryland, United States. 

In 1990, the Pakistan Navy entered in discussion with the Marina Militare (Italian Navy) of procuring these submarines in a view of decommissioning the SX-404-class submarines that was bought from Italy in 1970. The three designs of the Cosmos were originally intended for the export to the Republic of Korea Navy in 1983, which was already seeking the Dolgorae design. 

In 1990s, Pakistan bought the proprietary designs and had the engineers from the Italian firm, the Cosmos Spa, to re-design and constructed the Cosmos-class submarines in a joint venture with the KS&EW Ltd. at the Karachi Naval Dockyard in Karachi, Sindh, Pakistan. The KS&EW Ltd. received the production license for the Cosmos for export from her manufacturer and the first ship of her class was commissioned in the Navy in 1993. Two other submarines were entered in service in 1993 and 1996 respectively. The Cosmos serves as the swimmer delivery vehicle (SDV) for the Navy Special Service Group and were initially under their control until 2005 while stationed at PNS Iqbal in Karachi.

In 2005, the Cosmos control was given to the Commander Submarines (COMSUBS) for the operational deployments but later the control of the submarines were given back to the Navy Special Service Group under Command of the Coastal Areas (COMCOAST) for operational deployment while its engineering and maintenance remains under the Naval Strategic Forces Command.

, there are three Cosmos-class submarines that are active in the Navy as shown below:

References

External links
 MG110 Cosmos/X-Craft

Submarine classes
Submarines of Italy
Midget submarines
Submarines of the Pakistan Navy
Italy–Pakistan relations
Ships built in Pakistan
1993 in Pakistan
Cos.Mo.S